Jofre de Foixà (or Jaufre de Foixa) (died c. 1300) was a troubadour from Foixà in the Empordà, the second son of Bernard of Foixà.

At a young age Jofre became a Franciscan and appears in that position when mentioned for the first time at Monzón in 1267. In 1275 he put off the Franciscan habit for the black cowl of the Benedictines, almost certainly at the monastery of Sant Feliu de Guíxols. When the French under Philip III invaded Catalonia as part of the Aragonese Crusade, king Peter III nominated Jofre procurator of the monastery of Sant Pere de Galligants and trusted to him many important missions.

In 1293 he was in Sicily as abbot of San Giovanni degli Eremiti in Palermo. There he enjoyed the favour of both James II of Aragon and Frederick II. The last time Jofre is mentioned is in 1295. While in Sicily, Jofre was commissioned by James to write a tract, Vers e regles de trobar, concerning the rules of the troubadour art, mainly the grammar of Lemosi. The work, which contained many extracts from other troubadours, was intended to augment the Razos de trobar of Ramon Vidal. In his time, Vidal had written that "all people wish to listen to troubadour songs and to compose them, including Christians, Saracens, Jews, emperors, princes, kings, dukes, counts, viscounts, vavassours, clerics, townsmen, and villeins." By his time, Jofre could praise the engyn (understanding) of the laymen for the subtle vernacular grammar.

Among the other surviving works of Jofre are three cansos and a cobla. In one of his cansos he devotes different stanzas to the different works of his favourite troubadours: Arnaut de Maruelh (stanzas I and II), Perdigon (III and IV), Folquet de Marseille (V), Gaucelm Faidit (VI). This innovation was taken up by Petrarch, who did the same thing to celebrate the poets of the Dolce Stil Novo.

VII
Vostres suy tan, don'agradiv'e pros,
qu'on piegz mi faitz, ab amor pus enteyra
humils e francs e fis sopley vas vos.

Sources
Page, Christopher."Listening to the Trouvères." Early Music, Vol. 25, No. 4, 25th Anniversary Issue; Listening Practice. (Nov., 1997), pp 638–650, 653–656, and 659.

Notes

1300 deaths
People from Catalonia
12th-century Spanish troubadours
Italian Benedictines
Italian Franciscans
Italian abbots
Year of birth unknown
13th-century Sicilian people